Governor Carey may refer to:

Hugh Carey (1919–2011), 51st Governor of New York
Joseph M. Carey (1845–1924), 8th Governor of Wyoming
Robert D. Carey (1878–1937), 11th Governor of Wyoming

See also
List of people with surname Carey